Belauer See is a lake in Kreis Plön, Schleswig-Holstein, Germany. At an elevation of, its surface area is 1.13 km².

Lakes of Schleswig-Holstein